Twerk or twerking is a style of dancing.

Twerk may also refer to:

Music
"Twerk", a song by Juicy J from the mixtape Play Me Some Pimpin 2 (2009)
"Twerk", a song by Basement Jaxx from the album Scars (2009)
"Twerk", a song by Lady from the mixtape Bonafide Bitch (2011)
"Twerk", a song by Savage from the album Mayhem & Miracles (2012)
"Twerk", a song by Problem from the mixtape Ain't Nobody Hotter Than Me (2013)
"Twerk", a song by Lil Twist (2013)
"Twerk", a song by Miley Cyrus and Justin Bieber (2013)
"Twerk" (City Girls song), featuring Cardi B (2018)
"Twerk It", a song by Busta Rhymes from the album E.L.E.2 (2013)
"Twerk Off", a song by Lloyd (2013)
"Twerk Something (Radio)", a song by David Banner from the album Them Firewater Boyz, Vol. 1 (2000)
"Twerkin!!!", a song by Kreayshawn from the album Somethin' 'Bout Kreay (2012)
"Twerking", a song by twlv (2020)
"Twerksum", a song by Pooh Shiesty from the album Shiesty Season (2021)